Aurorae Chaos is a region of chaos terrain on Mars at the eastern end of the outflow channels from Valles Marineris into Chryse Planitia, centered at approximately ~324°E, 9°S.  It is in the Margaritifer Sinus quadrangle.

Many layers are visible in the walls of Aurorae Chaos.  Rock can form layers in a variety of ways.  Volcanoes, wind, or water can produce layers.
A detailed discussion of layering with many Martian examples can be found in Sedimentary Geology of Mars.

See also

 Areas of chaos terrain on Mars
 Chaos terrain
 HiRISE
 HiWish program
 Mars
 Geology of Mars
 Martian chaos terrain
 Outflow channels

References

Recommended reading
 Grotzinger, J. and R. Milliken (eds.).  2012.  Sedimentary Geology of Mars.  SEPM.

External links 

Chaotic terrains on Mars
Margaritifer Sinus quadrangle